Curd rice, also called yogurt rice, is a dish originating from India. The word "curd" in Indian English refers to unsweetened probiotic yogurt. It is most popular in the South Indian states of Tamil Nadu, Kerala ,  Karnataka, Telangana and Andhra Pradesh; and also in Maharashtra.
In the state of Maharashtra it is known as dahi bhat. In the state of Tamil Nadu it is called thayir soru, in Kerala it is called tayire chōre and in Telangana and Andhra Pradesh it is called perugannam/daddojanam. In Karnataka, it is called mosaranna. The dish is a staple of traditional cuisine, with the untempered version present at the end of almost every South Indian meal. The tempered version is often served during formal occasions and also offered as prasadam (blessed food) to devotees in temples.

Preparation

While it is most easily prepared by simply mixing steamed white rice and yogurt, more elaborate methods can be used when needed. Rice is prepared either via steaming or pressure cooking to be soft as in the South Indian style. It is then allowed to cool to room temperature, after which it is seasoned with finely chopped green chillies, ginger, and curry leaves, and sometimes along with the tempering of black gram, mustard seeds, cumin seeds, and asafoetida. Finally, curd and salt are added.

Alternatively, it can be prepared by mashing cooked plain rice (mostly leftovers) with some salt, curd and (a little milk to lessen the sourness) garnishing it with fried urad dal, mustard seeds, green chilli and chopped coriander. Also, adding a few chopped onions in bigger slices will help the curd rice from fermenting too quickly.

In some areas, curd rice is served in a unique style where steamed rice is mixed with mild curd, salted and then tempered with mustard seeds, curry leaves, dry chillies and black gram.  Garnishing varies with region, and ranges from grated carrots, pomegranate seeds, raisins, green and purple grapes, fried cashews to grated raw mango and boondi. It can be served lukewarm or chilled. Additional options include a pinch of powdered and roasted asafoetida.

Variations of the recipe are countless and are present in all states, reflecting the cuisine of each region. For example, in Karnataka, yogurt chillies (sandige menasu) are commonly added as part of the tempering. Regardless of this, the base components of rice, yogurt, tempered ingredients, and fresh ingredients are consistent, with the different ingredients included in each step varying.

Serving
Curd rice is often eaten accompanied by South Asian pickles. In South Indian cuisine, curd rice is traditionally eaten at the end of lunch and dinner, as this helps ease the effects of spicy food consumed prior. It is also said to aid digestion, as well as to balance the effects of the warm climate.

See also

 Cuisine of India
 List of rice dishes
 Rice congee
 South Indian cuisine
 Udupi cuisine

References

Indian rice dishes
South Indian cuisine